Czech Republic competed at the 2013 World Aquatics Championships in Barcelona, Spain, between 19 July and 4 August 2013.

High diving

Czech Republic has qualified one high diver.

Open water swimming

Czech Republic qualified five quota places for the following events in open water swimming.

Swimming

Czech swimmers achieved qualifying standards in the following events (up to a maximum of 2 swimmers in each event at the A-standard entry time, and 1 at the B-standard):

Men

Women

Synchronized swimming

Czech Republic has qualified two synchronized swimmers.

References

External links
Barcelona 2013 Official Site
Český svaz plaveckých sportů web site 

Nations at the 2013 World Aquatics Championships
2013 in Czech sport
Czech Republic at the World Aquatics Championships